This is a list of notable Albanians in Serbia, ethnic Albanians who were born in, lived, or trace their origins to the territory that is present-day Serbia.

History and politics 

 Tahir Efendi Jakova –  Albanian religious leader
 Kenan Evren –  Turkish politician and military officer, who served as the 7th President of Turkey from 1980 to 1989
 Branko Merxhani – Albanian intellectual, sociologist, writer, journalist and literary critic
 Sinan Hasani – Yugoslav novelist, statesman, diplomat and a former President of Presidency Yugoslavia
 Ivaz Mehmed Pasha – Ottoman-Albanian grand vizier and provincial governor
 Aćif Hadžiahmetović – Albanian politician in the Sandžak region of the Kingdom of Yugoslavia in the interwar period and during World War II 
 Ahmet Daca – Politician
 Ali Shukriu – Politician
 Ali Aliu – Albanian writer, economist, teacher, politician and political prisoner
 Nexhat Daci – Kosovo-Albanian politician
 Fatmir Hasani – Politician in Serbia
 Shaip Kamberi – politician 
 Riza Halimi – Politician in Serbia
 Shqiprim Arifi – Politician
 Ardita Sinani – Politician

Military 
 Idriz Seferi – Albanian nationalist figure and guerrilla fighter 
 Mazarek – Serbian nobleman and general in the service of the Serbian Despotate
 Džemail Koničanin – Military commander of the detachment of Sandžak Muslim militia

Cinema 
 Bekim Fehmiu – Yugoslavian theater and film actor. He was the first Eastern European actor to star in Hollywood during the Cold War.
 Faruk Begoli - Yugoslav actor of Albanian descent

Arts and entertainment 
 Fahri Beqiri – Albanian composer and former professor at the University of Prishtina Department of Music
 Edita Aradinović – Serbian recording artist
 Zana Nimani – pop singer
 Đogani - music group
 Đorđe Đogani - singer
 Merima Njegomir -  Serbian folk and sevdah singer

Media 
 Mirko Gashi  -  poet

Sports 
 Atdhe Nuhiu  -  footballer
 Berat Djimsiti  -  footballer
 Fidan Aliti  -  footballer
 Astrit Ajdarević  -  footballer
 Alfred Ajdarević  -  footballer
 Gjelbrim Taipi  -  footballer
 Betim Fazliji  -  footballer
 Arton Zekaj  -  footballer
 Faton Xhemaili  -  footballer
 Leutrim Pajaziti  -  footballer
 Arbnor Fejzullahu  -  footballer
 Ilaz Zylfiu  -  footballer
 Suad Sahiti  -  footballer
 Emir Sahiti  -  footballer
 Ervin Kurti  -  footballer
 Mimoza Hamidi  -  footballer

References 

Serbia